Velikan is a village in the municipality of Dimitrovgrad, in Haskovo Province, in southern Bulgaria.

Velikan Point on Smith Island, Antarctica is named after the village.

References

Villages in Haskovo Province